Oedosphenella canariensis is a species of tephritid or fruit flies in the genus Oedosphenella of the family Tephritidae.

Distribution
Canary Islands.

References

Tephritinae
Insects described in 1839
Diptera of Africa